Leona Ruth Hurwitz Zacharias (1907 – 1990) was an American scientist, researcher and lecturer at Massachusetts Eye and Ear. Her research considered retrolental fibroplasia, a condition that caused blindness in premature babies.

Early life and education 
Ruth Hurwitz Zacharias was born in New York City. Her family were Eastern European and her father was a mathematics teacher. In 1927, Zacharias graduated from Barnard College, where she majored in biology. She moved to Columbia University for her doctoral research, which considered cellular proliferation in grafted segments of spinal cord. At the time, she was the only woman scientist at Columbia.

Research and career 
Zacharias moved to Boston in 1942, where she was appointed a lecturer in opthalmic medicine at Harvard Medical School. In the 1940s, there was an increase in the number of premature babies going blind shortly after birth. The first case was documented in Boston in 1941, and was later documented as retrolental fibroplasia, a condition involving the growth of fibrous tissue behind the lens. After a few years, the syndrome was an epidemic. When Zacharias arrived at Massachusetts Eye and Ear Hospital, she worked alongside T. L. Terry. After Terry died in 1946, Zacharias joined the laboratory of V. Everett Kinsey, where she worked on the possible origins of retrolental fibroplasia. In 1952, she summarized the erroneous hypotheses of possible causes. By 1953, researchers around the world were investigating epidemics of retrolental fibroplasia, and it was learned that it was due to high levels of oxygen contained in incubators, which slowed the growth of blood vessels. When that oxygen was removed, the growth of new blood vessels pulled on the retina and detached. Together, Kinsey and Zacharias defined the causes and complications of the condition.

In 1956, Kinsey was awarded the Lasker Award, but Zacharias' name was omitted from the list of contributors. In 1968, she was made Principal Associate in Obstetrics. She held various positions at Massachusetts Institute of Technology, in the Department of Nutrition, Applied Biological Sciences and Brain and Cognitive Sciences.

Personal life 
Zacharias met her husband on a blind date in 1925, and the pair were married in 1927. Her husband, Jerrold R. Zacharias, was a nuclear physicist who was an advisor to Dwight D. Eisenhower. She liked dogs, and owned a succession of poodles. In 2023, Zacharias' story was documented by Katie Hafner in Scientific American.

Selected publications

References 

1907 births
1990 deaths
American medical researchers
Women medical researchers
20th-century American scientists
20th-century American women scientists
Scientists from New York City
Barnard College alumni
Columbia University alumni
Harvard Medical School faculty
Massachusetts Institute of Technology faculty